Koliri, is a village and a community in the municipality of Pyrgos, Elis, Greece. It is situated on a hillside, 3 km northeast of Pyrgos town centre and 3 km northwest of Varvasaina. The Greek National Road 74 (Tripoli – Olympia – Pyrgos) passes south of the village. Its population, according to the 2011 census, is 621 for the village, and 979 for the community, which includes the village Kolireikes Parangges. It has two churches: the Church of Saint Nicholas and the Church of the Saints Theodore. Its elevation is 90 m. Koliri suffered damage from the fires of August 2007. Koliri has a football team called Anatoli (meaning Sunrise in Greek), which plays in the local championships.

Population

Gallery

See also
List of settlements in Elis

References

External links
Koliri at the GTP Travel Pages
Koliri - A Historical Review

Pyrgos, Elis
Populated places in Elis